Square is a studio album by Canadian hip hop musician Buck 65. It was released on WEA in 2002. Although it consists of four tracks, each track consists of multiple songs. The album was nominated for the 2003 Juno Awards for Alternative Album of the Year and Album Design of the Year.

Critical reception
Rollie Pemberton of Pitchfork gave the album a 7.0 out of 10, describing it as "a melodic mix of folk rock sensibility, smooth early 90s style production, clever lyrical observations and a relatively enjoyable train ride into the mental station of Halifax's best-known emcee." Meanwhile, Clay Jarvis of Stylus Magazine gave the album a grade of B+, saying, "Square is built solely out of his strengths: hazy introspection, sparse snare-and-kick beats and simple, dismal instrumental refrains."

Track listing

Personnel
Credits adapted from liner notes.

 Buck 65 – words, beats, scratches
 Greymatter – helping hands
 Charles Austin – helping hands
 DJ Signify – helping hands
 Jorun – helping hands
 Yan – helping hands
 James Paterson – cover art, design
 Robbie Cameron – cover art, design

References

External links
 
 

2002 albums
Buck 65 albums
Warner Music Group albums